is a private junior college in Kasukabe, Saitama, Japan, established in 1984.

Academic department 
 Academic department of Social Welfare

External links
 Official website 

Japanese junior colleges
Educational institutions established in 1984
Private universities and colleges in Japan
Universities and colleges in Saitama Prefecture
1984 establishments in Japan